Joshua Derek Adam Holden (born January 18, 1978) is a former Canadian professional ice hockey centre who is currently the assistant Coach for EV Zug of the National League (NL) in Switzerland. He was drafted in the first round, 12th overall, by the Vancouver Canucks in the 1996 NHL Entry Draft.

Playing career
Holden was born in Calgary, Alberta. After playing four seasons in the Western Hockey League with the Regina Pats, finishing in the league's top ten in scoring in both 1995–96 and 1996–97, Holden made his National Hockey League debut with the Canucks in the 1998–99 season, appearing in 30 games. After he played in 16 games with the Canucks over the next two seasons, he was claimed on waivers by the Carolina Hurricanes before the 2001–02 season. Holden played in eight games with Carolina before rejoining the Canucks' organization. He then was traded by Vancouver to the Toronto Maple Leafs on June 23, 2002, in exchange for Jeff Farkas.

During the 2004–05 NHL lockout, Holden went to Finland's SM-liiga to play for HPK. While the NHL resumed play in 2005–06, Holden stayed in Europe, joining HC Fribourg-Gottéron of Switzerland's Nationalliga A.

He was named MPP of the National League A in the 2009-2010 Season, based on an internal evaluation by the team's coaches and captains. In 2010, EV Zug and Josh Holden announced a long-term contract extension.

To date, he has only appeared in 60 NHL games, scoring five goals and nine assists.

On December 31, 2012, Josh Holden was part of the Canadian Ice Hockey Team that won the Spengler Cup.

On May 15, 2017, Holden agreed to a one-year contract extension to remain within the EV Zug organization and play with their affiliate, the EVZ Academy, in the Swiss League (SL).

After retiring at the end of the 2017–18 season he became the assistant coach for EV Zug for the 2018–19 season and resigned as assistant coach again in 2019–20.

Personal life
Josh Holden was born in Calgary, Canada and has two sisters. He is married to Janie Holden and has four children: Cody, Noa, Maren and Kapri.

Career statistics

Regular season and playoffs

International

Awards and achievements
 Named to the WHL East Second All-Star Team in 1998

References

External links

1978 births
Living people
Canadian expatriate ice hockey players in Finland
Canadian expatriate ice hockey players in the United States
Canadian ice hockey centres
Carolina Hurricanes players
EV Zug players
HC Fribourg-Gottéron players
HPK players
Kansas City Blades players
Manitoba Moose players
National Hockey League first-round draft picks
Regina Pats players
SCL Tigers players
St. John's Maple Leafs players
Ice hockey people from Calgary
Syracuse Crunch players
Toronto Maple Leafs players
Vancouver Canucks draft picks
Vancouver Canucks players